Blue Angel Cafe  (Also known as: Object of Desire), is a 1989 Italian erotic film directed by Joe D'Amato.

Plot
United States, late 1980s. When Raymond Derek, a young politician with a great career, a beautiful wife and an expensive home, encounters sexy cabaret singer Angie, he sees his life fall apart because the press finds out and it becomes front-page news.

Cast

 Tara Buckman as Angie
 Richard Brown as Raymond Derek
 Rick Anthony Munroe as William
 Jayne Gray as Kate
 Ken Werbinski as Steve
 Moses Gibson as Butler
 Daniel Smith as Mr. Peterson
 Richard Frank Sume as TV Journalist		
 Vera M. Moore as Journalist

Release
The film was released in United Kingdom on August 18, 1989

Reception
In 1991, Video Watchdog called the film a "blasé potboiler" and derided the main character's nightclub act as "consist[ing] of only one boring "I'm-Down-And-Out-But-I'm-Fightin'-Back" number - delivered à la Minnelli in Dietrich duds".

See also
 List of Italian films of 1989

Notes

External links
 
 Blue Angel Cafe at Variety Distribution

Films directed by Joe D'Amato
Films scored by Luigi Ceccarelli
1989 films
1980s erotic drama films
Italian erotic drama films
1989 crime drama films
1980s Italian films